Sugeng Efendi (born 31 August 1998), is an Indonesian professional footballer who plays as a winger for Liga 1 club Dewa United.

Club career

Persela Lamongan
He was signed for Persela Lamongan to play in Liga 1 in the 2018 season. Sugeng made his first-team debut on 24 March 2018 in a match against Persipura Jayapura. Sugeng scored his first goal for Persela in the 60th minute against Persipura Jayapura.

PSIM Yogyakarta
In 2021, Sugeng signed a contract with Indonesian Liga 2 club PSIM Yogyakarta. He made his league debut on 26 September in a 1–0 loss against PSCS Cilacap. On 19 October 2021, Sugeng scored his first goal for PSIM in the 86th minute against PSG Pati.

Dewa United
Sugeng was signed for Dewa United to play in Liga 1 in the 2022–23 season. He made his league debut on 25 July 2022 in a match against Persis Solo at the Moch. Soebroto Stadium, Magelang.

Career statistics

Club

Notes

References

External links
 Sugeng Efendi at Soccerway
 Sugeng Efendi at Liga Indonesia

1998 births
Living people
Indonesian footballers
Association football midfielders
Liga 1 (Indonesia) players
Liga 2 (Indonesia) players
Persela Lamongan players
PSIM Yogyakarta players
Dewa United F.C. players
People from Magelang
Sportspeople from Central Java